UPN 9 can refer to the following stations formerly affiliated with UPN:
 KNIN-TV in Boise, now affiliated with Fox
 KMSP-TV in Minneapolis-St. Paul, now owned-and-operated by Fox
 KUSI-TV in San Diego, now an independent station (cable channel, broadcasts on channel 51)
 WWOR-TV in New York City, now with MyNetworkTV
 WCTX in Hartford-New Haven, now with MyNetworkTV (cable channel, broadcasts on channel 59)